The Aprilia Mana 850 is an automatic transmission motorcycle made by Aprilia from 2007 to 2016.

The Mana has an  90° V-twin engine with a continuously variable transmission (CVT). The transmission has three mode settings: Sport, Touring, and Rain. Sport mode provides maximum power, engine braking, and torque; Touring mode scales back the responsiveness and improves fuel savings; Rain mode reduces torque by 25%. The transmission can also be set to Manual (gearbox) and shifted using the standard foot-shift or paddle-shifters mounted on the left grip. The instrument panel includes a gear indicator. The Mana 850 is also available partially faired, called the Mana 850 GT.

Motor Cycle News described it as "a sort of half-scooter, half motorcycle designed to be the bike for all occasions.". "What Bike?" magazine says the Mana is "small, light, comfy, and a dream to ride in town." A "Motorcycle.com" reviewer was very positive, saying, " I didn’t expect the Mana to be much of a sportbike, but it is".

Notes

External links

 
 
Aprilia Mana 850 GT reviews

MANA 850
Standard motorcycles
Motorcycles introduced in 2008